Štěpán [ˈʃcɛpaːn] is both a masculine Czech given name, equivalent of English Stephen, and a Czech surname. Notable people with the name include:

Given names
 Štěpán Hřebejk (b. 1982), Czech ice hockey player
 Štěpán Janáček (b. 1977), Czech pole vaulter
 Štěpán Kodeda (1988–2015), Czech orienteering competitor
 Štěpán Kolář (b. 1979), Czech footballer
 Štěpán Koreš (b. 1989), Czech footballer
 Štěpán Krtička (b. 1996), Czech child actor
 Štěpán Kučera (b. 1984), Czech footballer
 Štěpán Rak (b. 1945), Czech classical guitarist and composer
 Štěpán Tesařík (b. 1978), Czech hurdler
 Štěpán Trochta (1905–1974), Czech cardinal
 Štěpán Vachoušek (b. 1979), Czech footballer

Surname
 Joseph Anton Steffan or Josef Antonín Štěpán (1726–1797), Bohemian composer
 Miroslav Štěpán (1945–2014), Czechoslovak politician
 Pavel Štěpán (1925–1998), Czech pianist
 Vojtěch Štěpán (b. 1985) Czech footballer

Czech-language surnames
Czech masculine given names